Airplane Mode is a 2020 Brazilian comedy film directed by César Rodrigues from a screenplay by Alberto Bremer and written by Renato Fagundes and Alice Name-Bomtempo. It stars Larissa Manoela, Erasmo Carlos, Katiuscia Canoro, André Frambach and Dani Ornellas. The film was released on 23 January 2020 by Netflix.

Plot 

Ana, a fashion design student dreaming of becoming a great stylist, drops everything to become a digital influencer for a famous brand in a city where she was involved in all fake relationships, who just uses her celebrity status for their own benefit which she is unaware of. But when she crashes her car while using her phone, she is forced into a digital detox by her parents at her grandfather's farm in a village.

The experience both teaches her how to connect with others again face-to-face, as well as getting back into fashion design.

Cast

Production 
In April 2019, it was announced during the 2019 Rio2C (Rio Creative Conference) event that Netflix would produce its first Brazilian comedy film starring Larissa Manoela. In July 2019, it was announced that Erasmo Carlos, Katiuscia Canoro, André Frambach and Dani Ornellas had joined the cast of the film. The quality of the English dub was reported to be poor with bad lipsync.

Reception 
John Serba of Decider wrote, "Airplane Mode is sloppy and formulaic, more feelblah than feelgood, and as deep as a puddle on the arid steppes of Patagonia".

References

External links 
 
 

2020 films
2020 comedy films
Brazilian comedy films
Films about social media
Portuguese-language Netflix original films
2020s Portuguese-language films